Fjellhamar is a railway station on the Trunk Line in Lørenskog, Norway. It is served by the Oslo Commuter Rail line L1 operated by Vy running from Lillestrøm via Oslo S to Spikkestad. The station was opened in 1931, but the current station was built from scratch in 2003.

External links
Jernbaneverket's entry on Fjellhamar station

Railway stations in Lørenskog
Railway stations on the Trunk Line
Railway stations opened in 1931
1931 establishments in Norway